Forkhead box B1 is a protein that in humans is encoded by the FOXB1 gene.

References

Further reading 

Forkhead transcription factors